Essential Pogues is a greatest hits album by The Pogues, released in November 1991.

Track listing 
"The Sunny Side of the Street" (Shane MacGowan, Jem Finer) 
"If I Should Fall From Grace With God" (MacGowan) 
"Lorelei" (Phil Chevron) 
"Thousands Are Sailing" (Chevron)
"White City" (MacGowan)
"Fairytale of New York" (MacGowan, Finer)
"Fiesta" (MacGowan, Finer, Kotscher, Lindt)
"Rain Street" (MacGowan)
"Turkish Song of the Damned" (MacGowan, Finer)
"Summer in Siam" (MacGowan)
"Misty Morning, Albert Bridge" (Finer)
"Blue Heaven" (MacGowan, Hunt)
"Honky Tonk Woman" (Jagger, Richards)
"Yeah, Yeah, Yeah, Yeah, Yeah (Long Version)" (MacGowan)

Personnel 
 Shane MacGowan - lead vocals, guitar
 Terry Woods - cittern, vocals
 Philip Chevron - guitar, vocals
 Spider Stacy - tin whistle, vocals
 Andrew Ranken - drums
 Jem Finer - banjo, saxophone
 Darryl Hunt - bass guitar
 Kirsty MacColl - vocals on "Fairytale of New York"
 James Fearnley - accordion

Other musicians 
 Cait O'Riordan - bass, vocals
 Siobhan Sheahan - harp on "Fairytale of New York"
 Henry Benagh - fiddle
 Elvis Costello - acoustic guitar
 Brian Clarke - alto saxophone on "Fiesta"
 Joe Cashman - tenor saxophone on "Fiesta"
 Eli Thompson - trumpet on "Fiesta"
 Chris Lee - trumpet
 Paul Taylor - trombone
 Ron Kavana - tenor banjo, mandolin on "Thousands Are Sailing"

Notes 
 Tracks produced by Steve Lillywhite except tracks 1, 8, and 10 - Joe Strummer

References

1991 greatest hits albums
The Pogues albums
Albums produced by Steve Lillywhite